Masters of the Sea was a 1994 Singapore English's very first television drama series produced by the Television Corporation of Singapore (TCS) (now Mediacorp). It was the first full-length Singapore English drama series to produced in Singapore officially opened on Wednesday, 12 October 1994 to officially closed Wednesday, 22 February 1995. This drama serial consists of 20 episodes. The drama began production on 1 May 1994 and completed on 8 August 1994 durated 100 days. This drama was aired on Singapore's national free-to-air terrestrial channel by Television Corporation of Singapore (TCS) (now Mediacorp) Channel 5 every Wednesday from 10:00pm to 10:30pm SST duration time 30 minutes before News 5 Tonight with audio language localised into Singapore English/Singlish dubbed. The series starred Wong Li-Lin, Ng Chin Han, Irene Ng, Bryan Wong, Lim Kay Tong and Donald Li.

Masters of the Sea was derided by some as "fairly disastrous" One of the criticisms was that it portrayed an elderly Chinese Singaporean woman wearing the wrong costumes and ornaments and speaking the wrong phrases.

In Indonesia, Masters of the Sea was aired on Indonesian commercial free-to-air terrestrial television by RCTI was officially opened on Wednesday, 12 October 1994 to officially closed Wednesday, 22 February 1995 every Wednesday from 9.00pm to 9.30pm WIB before delayed programme of Dunia Dalam Berita (simulcast on TVRI) with audio language localised into Singapore English/Singlish dubbed and no commercial.

In Malaysia, Masters of the Sea was aired on Malaysian commercial free-to-air terrestrial television by TV3 was officially opened on Wednesday, 12 October 1994 to officially closed Wednesday, 22 February 1995 every Wednesday from 10.00pm to 10.30pm MST before TV3 Evening News with audio language localised into Singapore English/Singlish dubbed.

References

1994 Singaporean television series debuts
1995 Singaporean television series endings
Singaporean television series
1990s Singaporean television series